The women's 880 yards at the 1962 British Empire and Commonwealth Games as part of the athletics programme was held at the Perry Lakes Stadium on Saturday 1 December 1962.

After a 16-year absence, the event made its return to the women's program and was won by the world record holder, Australian Dixie Willis. Willis finished two seconds ahead of Marise Chamberlain from New Zealand and her fellow countrywoman Joy Jordan. The winning time of 2:03.7 easily accounted for the Games record set by Englishwoman Gladys Lunn in 1934, with all but last place finisher posting times inside the mark.

Records

The following records were established during the competition:

Final

References

Women's 880 yards
1962